The Second Ballot Act 1908 was an electoral system in place from 1908 to 1913 in New Zealand. It applied to elections to the House of Representatives. It was used in the 1908 and 1911 general elections, and a number of by-elections. It was introduced by the Liberal Government under Joseph Ward, who feared that the emergence of the Independent Political Labour League (IPLL) would split the vote on the political left and thus be beneficial to the conservative opposition, who in 1909 formed the Reform Party. Ward expected that this electoral mechanism would result in all second ballots to be between Liberal and conservative (Reform) candidates. In the  electorate, however, two Liberal candidates received similar votes and both were eliminated in the first ballot. This left the Labour candidate, David McLaren, facing a conservative candidate and with many liberal voters transferring their allegiance to McLaren, he became the only candidate of the IPLL who was ever elected to the House of Representatives.

The Second Ballot Act applied to general electorates only, and not to the four Maori constituencies.

The following by-elections were held using the Second Ballot Act:

References

Repealed New Zealand legislation
Election legislation
1908 in New Zealand law